The Swiss Indoors is a professional men's tennis tournament played on indoor hard courts at the St. Jakobshalle in Basel, Switzerland.

History
The historical precursor event to this tournament was called the Swiss International Covered Courts that ran from 1920 to 1959, that was a fully open event for international players. To fill that gap this tournament was created in 1970 by Roger Brennwald and originally featured mainly Swiss top players. It became an event on the Grand Prix tennis circuit in 1977, when Björn Borg won the title and stayed until 1989. Since 2009 it has been part of the World Tour 500 Series of the ATP Tour. Before 2009, it was part of the  ATP World Series from 1990 until 1999 which became the ATP International Series in 2000. It has been held annually at the St. Jakobshalle in Basel, Switzerland, in October, since 1995.

Basel native Roger Federer holds the record for most singles titles, having won the tournament ten times, in 2006–2008, 2010–2011, 2014–2015 and 2017–2019. Federer has reached the final record fifteen times (2000–2001, 2006–2015, 2017–2019), which is also an Open Era record for most finals reached at a single ATP event.

Besides Federer, two other Swiss players have won the singles title: Michel Burgener, in 1972, and Jakob Hlasek, in 1991. The tournament was played on its unique red-colored indoor courts until 2010; starting in 2011 the court color was changed to the uniform blue courts of most other tournaments in the European fall indoor season.

The tournament has been sponsored in the past by Ebel and Davidoff.

Past finals

Singles

Doubles

Statistics

Records

Most singles titles: 10
 Roger Federer (2006–2008, 2010–2011, 2014–2015, 2017–2019)
Most singles finals: 15 (10 titles, 5 runner-ups)
 Roger Federer (2000–2001, 2006–2015, 2017–2019)
Most consecutive singles finals: 10
 Roger Federer (2006–2015)
Most matches played: 84
 Roger Federer (1999–2019)
Most matches won: 75
 Roger Federer (1999–2019)
Most tournament appearances: 19
 Roger Federer (1999–2019)

See also
 Swiss Open

Notes

References

External links

Official website
Profile on atptour.com

 
Tennis tournaments in Switzerland
Indoor tennis tournaments
Hard court tennis tournaments
ATP Tour 500
Sport in Basel
Recurring sporting events established in 1970